Jozef Herda (21 April 1910 – 4 October 1985) was a Czechoslovak wrestler. He was born in Trnava. He won an Olympic silver medal in Greco-Roman wrestling in 1936.

References

1910 births
1985 deaths
Sportspeople from Trnava
Czechoslovak male sport wrestlers
Slovak male sport wrestlers
Olympic wrestlers of Czechoslovakia
Wrestlers at the 1936 Summer Olympics
Czech male sport wrestlers
Olympic silver medalists for Czechoslovakia
Olympic medalists in wrestling
Medalists at the 1936 Summer Olympics